A Dahir is a Moroccan King's decree.

Examples 
 June 4, 1864, promoting free trade with foreign countries
 November, 1892, Establishing the first cherifan organized postal service
 February, 1907, dahir establishing the monopolistic powers in issuing currency the Moroccan state Bank
 August 12, 1913 - Criminal proceedings
 March 11, 1915 - Education
 November 17, 1915 - Creation of the 5-branch Seal of Solomon Flag of Morocco.
November 8, 1919 - Creation of Compagnie de Transports au Maroc
 November 1, 1926 - Bibliothèque Générale et Archives (the Moroccan national library) becomes a public establishment.
 May 16, 1930 - Berber justice (known as Berber Dahir)
 April 26, 1956 – Establishment of the Ministry of Foreign Affairs.
 May 16, 1956 - Establishment of the General Directorate for National Security (State police)
 July 16, 1957 - trade unions
 September 6, 1958 - Moroccan nationality code 
 July 21, 1959 - Founding and organization of Moroccan universities.
 June 23, 1960 - Organization of communes
 October 24, 1962 - Agricultural chambers
 September 12, 1963 - Organization of prefectures and provinces 
 November 13, 1963 - Education
 June 16, 1971 - Organization of regions of Morocco
 September 30, 1976 - New communal Organization
 April 2, 1997 - Decentralization, reorganization en the 16 regions of Morocco
 October 17, 2001 - n° 1-01-299 - Creation of the Royal institute of the Amazigh culture
 October 3, 2002 - The communal chart
 April 10, 2004 - Creation of Equity and Reconciliation Commission

References

Law of Morocco
Dahirs